Tolylfluanid is an  organic chemical compound that is used as an active ingredient in fungicides and wood preservatives.

Synthesis 
The synthesis of tolylfluanid begins with the reaction of dimethylamine and sulfuryl chloride. The product further reacts with p-toluidine and dichlorofluoromethanesulfenyl chloride to yield the final product.

Use  
Tolylfluanid is used on fruit and ornamental plants against gray mold (Botrytis), against late blight on tomatoes and against powdery mildew on cucumbers.

Environmental behavior 
Tolylfluanid hydrolyzes slowly in acidic conditions. The half-life is shorter when the pH is high; at pH = 7, it is at least 2 days. In aerobic media (pH = 7.7-8.0), tolylfluanid hydrolytically and microbially decomposes to N,N-dimethyl-N-(4-methylphenyl) sulfamide (DMST) and dimethylsulfamide. After 14 days, tolylfluanid is generally considered to have degraded. The half-life of DMST is 50-70 days.

Absorption, metabolism and excretion 
Tolylfluanid is rapidly and almost completely absorbed in the gastrointestinal tract. The highest concentrations are found in the blood, lungs, liver, kidneys, spleen and thyroid gland. 99% is excreted in the urine within two days, although there is some accumulation in the thyroid gland.

References

External links  
 EPA Factsheet 
 Tolyfluanid (PubChem @ NIH) 

Sulfamides
Organochlorides
Organofluorides
 Fungicides 
 Alkyl-substituted benzenes